The Barrington Ice Dogs were a Junior hockey franchise based in Barrington, Nova Scotia.They played in the Nova Scotia Junior C Hockey League.

History

The Ice Dogs are five-time Nova Scotia Provincial Jr. C Champions, winning titles in 2001, 2004, 2005, 2006, and 2009. They have also appeared in four (2004, 2005, 2006, 2009) Maritime-Hockey North Junior C Championships winning titles in 2005 and 2009. In his eight years behind the bench, Dana McCarthy was the most successful Head Coach in team history, guiding the team to four of its five Nova Scotia Championships, as well as both Maritime-Hockey North titles.

The Ice Dogs drew the biggest crowds of any team in the NSJRCHL with approx. 500-1500 per game, with their most vocal fans occupying "The Dog Pound" overlooking the opposition's end of the arena.

The Ice Dogs announced that they would be taking a leave of absence for the 2015-16 season.  Losing the closest and biggest rival for the Clare Lions, the Lions also elected to take a leave of absence.  Both teams remain out of the league as of 2020.

External Contacts
 Ice Dog Page
 Nova Scotia Jr C Page
                                                                                                                                

                                                                                                                                     

Ice hockey teams in Nova Scotia
1999 establishments in Nova Scotia
Ice hockey clubs established in 1999